TransOlímpica is a bus rapid transit (BRT) line in Rio de Janeiro connecting Barra da Tijuca and Deodoro. It opened on 9 July 2016 with 17 stations, and is the third line of the Rio de Janeiro BRT system. The new route has two carriageways with three lanes in each direction and one bus lane for each carriageway.

References

Transolímpica